Hamed Hosseinalizadeh (born January 9, 1998) is an Iranian football forward who currently plays for Iranian club Pars Jonoubi in the Iran Pro League.

References

Iranian footballers
1998 births
Living people
Association football wingers
Tractor S.C. players